Shchedryk is the oldest running professional children's choir in Kyiv, Ukraine. It was founded in 1971 and directed by the choral conductor Irina Sablina until her retirement, after which her daughter Maria Sablina replaced her in 2003. Shchedryk's repertoire includes about 1,000 works from the Renaissance and Baroque, classical, romantic and modern music, and folk songs from around the world.

Awards 

 Grand Prix of the International Choral Kathaumixw festival in Powell River (Canada), 1990
 Grand Prix of the Des Moines International Children's Choral Festival (USA), 1992
 Grand Prix and Gold Diploma of the XXXVI International Choral Music Festival in Międzyzdroje (Poland), 2001
 Gold Diploma of the Highest Degree and Grand Prix of the I International Competition "Musica sacra a Roma" in Rome (Italy), 2005
 Grand Prix ("Golden David") of the VII International Florence Choir Festival (Italy), 2018
 First place with honors "Outstanding Success" in their category at XIII Summa Cum Laude International Youth Music festival  (Austria), 2019

References

External links 

 Official webpage

Musical groups from Kyiv
Ukrainian choirs
Music in Kyiv
Musical groups established in the 1970s